The 1974–75 Algerian Championnat National was the 13th season of the Algerian Championnat National since its establishment in 1962. A total of 16 teams contested the league, with JS Kawkabi as the defending champions.

Team summaries

Promotion and relegation 
Teams promoted from Algerian Division 2 1974-1975 
 USM Maison-Carrée
 CA Batna
 ASM Oran

Teams relegated to Algerian Division 2 1975-1976
 MC Saïda
 USM Sétif
 USM Blida

League table

References

External links
1974–75 Algerian Championnat National

Algerian Ligue Professionnelle 1 seasons
1974–75 in Algerian football
Algeria